Laleh Bejan (also Romanized as Lāleh Bejān) is a village in Ozomdel-e Shomali Rural District, in the Central District of Varzaqan County, East Azerbaijan Province, Iran. At the 2006 census, its population was 259, in 64 families.

References 

Towns and villages in Varzaqan County